The Dean of Achonry used to be based at the Cathedral Church of St Crumnathy, Achonry (closed in 1997) in the Diocese of Achonry within the united bishopric of Tuam, Killala and Achonry of the Church of Ireland.

List of deans of Achonry
1582–1591: Owen O'Connor (afterwards Bishop of Killala, 1591)
1615 William Flanagan (also Dean of Killala, 1613) 
1628/9 William Buchanan (also Dean of Killala and afterwards Dean of Tuam, 1661) 
1661 Randal or Rodolph Hollingwood 
1662 James Vaughan
1683 William Lloyd (afterwards Bishop of Killala and Achonry, 1691) 
1691–1694 Samuel Foley (afterwards Bishop of Down and Connor, 1694) 
1694/5–1733 John Yeard 
1733–1751 Sutton Symes
1752–1791 Richard Handcock 
1791–1806 James Langrishe
1806–1812 James Hastings
1812–1821 Arthur Henry Kenney
1821–1824 William Greene
1824–1839 Theophilus Blakely (afterwards Dean of Down, 1839) 
1839–1850 Edward Newenham Hoare (afterwards Dean of Waterford, 1850)
1850–1872 Hervey de Montmorency, 4th Viscount Mountmorres
1872-1882  Arthur Moore 
1886-1895 Hamilton Townsend
1895–1907 George Abraham Heather
1907–1914 Thomas Gordon Walker
1916–1927 Thomas Allen

References

External links
St Crumnathy’s Cathedral, Achonry — photograph at flickr.com

 
Diocese of Tuam, Killala and Achonry
Achonry